Marburn Academy is a non-profit independent day school for students in grades 1–12 school in New Albany, Ohio. The school was created in 1981 as an alternative for gifted students  who have ADHD or dyslexia. The school is one of 18 accredited Orton-Gillingham schools in the United States.

In January 2017, Marburn Academy moved from Forest Park East, Columbus, to a new location at 9555 Johnstown Road, New Albany, Ohio 43054.

References

External links 

Academy of Orton-Gillingham Practitioners and Educators

Private schools in Ohio
Preparatory schools in Ohio
Alternative schools
Educational institutions established in 1981
1981 establishments in Ohio